Giovanni Valentino Gentile (c.1520 in Scigliano – 10 September 1566 in Bern) was an Italian humanist and non-trinitarian.

As a young man he was influenced by Giorgio Siculo's teaching against paedobaptism and transubstantiation. In Naples he was exposed to Waldensian teachings, and those of Juan de Valdés, and was part of the Accademia Cosentina.

In 1546 he took part in the Collegia Vicentina in Vicenza, adopting the Unitarian view of Lelio Sozzini. After the 1550 Anabaptist Council of Venice antitrinitarians were persecuted by the Council of Ten and in 1557 Gentile fled with Apollonio Merenda to Geneva – already home to Giorgio Biandrata, Nicola Gallo, Giovanni Paolo Alciati and Matteo Gribaldi, and there, in 1558, he aligned with Alciati and Biandrata against Jean Calvin. On May 18, 1558 Calvin required all the Italian exiles in Geneva to affirm a Trinitarian statement, which Gentile first refused to sign, but then following the others, did so. At this period the Italian exiles in Geneva were forming the idea of Christ as a person subordinate to God, the Father, and of the Holy Spirit as simply God's power. In June Gentile and Nicola Gallo were denounced and tried for heresy and blasphemy by Calvin himself with the result that Gentile was sentenced to beheading. The charge was commuted when Gentile agreed to go through the city barefoot in a shirt, the heralds ahead of him, recanting his heresy, and to burn his own writings. The bailiff of Bern he managed to incense by dedicating a booklet to him.

Gentile and Giovanni Paolo Alciati della Motta then followed Biandrata to safety in Pinczòw, the "Sarmatian Athens", 1562–66. During this period cardinal Giovanni Francesco Commendone succeeded in persuading John II Sigismund to implement the Edict of Parczòw 1564, expelling all the Italian and German Calvinists and Antitrinitarians. Gentile, Bernardino Ochino and Alciati set out for Slavkov u Brna in Moravia, where Nicola Paruta was, and where Ochino died in 1565. Gentile returned to Bern, but challenged the French Protestants to a public debate on the Trinity. Before any debate could take place, he was arrested, imprisoned, and Théodore de Bèze and Heinrich Bullinger urged the bailiff to take the strictest sentence. He was executed 10 September 1566.

References

1520s births
1566 deaths
Italian Unitarians
People from the Province of Cosenza
People executed for heresy